Bay Mills Resort & Casino is a casino and hotel located in Brimley, Michigan, on the shore of St. Mary's River, which opened in November 1995. It is owned and operated by the Bay Mills Indian Community. Bay Mills Resort & Casino is the land-based partner of DraftKings in the state of Michigan.

History
Bay Mills Resort & Casino was opened by the Bay Mills Indian Community in November 1995.

Features
Bay Mills Resort & Casino features a  gaming floor that includes approximately 600 slots and over a dozen table games, multiple restaurants, and a hotel with 143 rooms.

See also

 Kings Club Casino
 List of casinos in Michigan

References

External links
Official Website

1995 establishments in Michigan
Buildings and structures in Chippewa County, Michigan
Casinos in Michigan
Casinos completed in 1995
Hotel buildings completed in 1995
Native American casinos
Tourist attractions in Chippewa County, Michigan
Casino hotels
Native American history of Michigan
Ojibwe in the United States